Tallykulevo (Tallıqul) is a rural locality (a village) in Kanly-Turkeyevsky Selsoviet, Buzdyaksky District, Bashkortostan, Russia. The population was 354 as of 2010. There are 4 streets.

Geography 
Tallykulevo is located 27 km southwest of Buzdyak (the district's administrative centre) by road. Telyakey-Kubovo is the nearest rural locality.

References 

Rural localities in Buzdyaksky District